Raúl Entrerríos Rodríguez (born 12 February 1981) is a Spanish handball player and handball coach.

He participated at the 2008 Summer Olympics in Beijing as a member of the Spain men's national handball team. The team won a bronze medal, defeating Croatia.

His older brother Alberto Entrerríos is a Spanish international handball player.

In 2021 he ended his club career, and will from the summer of 2021 be coaching FC Barcelona's U18-team.

References

External links

Spanish male handball players
Handball players at the 2008 Summer Olympics
Handball players at the 2012 Summer Olympics
Olympic handball players of Spain
Olympic bronze medalists for Spain
Living people
Liga ASOBAL players
FC Barcelona Handbol players
CB Ademar León players
BM Valladolid players
Olympic medalists in handball
1981 births
Medalists at the 2008 Summer Olympics
Real Grupo de Cultura Covadonga sportsmen
Sportspeople from Gijón
Handball players at the 2020 Summer Olympics
Medalists at the 2020 Summer Olympics